Stephanie A. Snedden is an American astronomer at the Apache Point Observatory of the New Mexico State University in New Mexico, United States. The minor planet 133008 Snedden is named after her; it was discovered by the Sloan Digital Sky Survey at Apache Point Observatory on 5 October 2002. She has published papers including The Case for Optically Thick High-Velocity Broad-Line Region Gas in Active Galactic Nuclei.

Education
Snedden gained her BS from Sonoma State University in 1983, her MS in physics and astronomy from the University of Nebraska in 1995, and her PhD from University of Nebraska in 2001.

Research interests
Snedden studies the physics of active galactic nuclei, particularly the structure and kinematics of gas in the broad-line region.

Media
Snedden appeared on Nova, in the 13 April 2010 documentary Hunting the Edge of Space: The Ever-Expanding Universe.

Bibliography

References

External links 
 Interview clips with Sneddon filmed during the making of 400 Years of the Telescope.

Living people
1950 births
American astrophysicists
Sonoma State University alumni
University of Nebraska–Lincoln alumni
American women scientists
21st-century American women